Acraea kappa is a butterfly in the family Nymphalidae. It is found in Tanzania, from the western part of the country to the Kigoma-Mpanda district.

Taxonomy
It is a member of the Acraea terpsicore  species group   -   but see also Pierre & Bernaud, 2014

References

External links

Images representing Acraea kappa at Bold

Butterflies described in 1979
kappa
Endemic fauna of Tanzania
Butterflies of Africa